The name Gading was used for nine tropical cyclones in the Philippines by PAGASA in the Western Pacific Ocean.

 Tropical Storm Lola (1966) (T6605, 05W, Gading) – struck the Philippines and southern China as a relatively strong tropical storm.
 Tropical Depression 07W (1970) (07W, Gading) – a system that was considered by JMA as a tropical depression and by JTWC as a tropical storm; hit Taiwan and southeastern China.
 Tropical Storm Harriet (1974) (T7409, 10W, Gading) – a tropical storm which did not affect land.
 Tropical Depression Gading (1978) – a minimal tropical depression which affected Taiwan.
 Tropical Depression Gading (1982) – another short-lived tropical depression that was only tracked by PAGASA.
 Typhoon Peggy (1986) (T8607, 07W, Gading) – the strongest tropical cyclone in 1986 and one of the most intense typhoons recorded; struck the Philippines and China causing widespread destruction, killing 422.
 Typhoon Yancy (1990) (T9012, 13W, Gading) – relatively strong typhoon which made landfall the Philippines, Taiwan and mainland China, claiming at least 284 lives.
 Tropical Storm Sharon (1994) (T9404, 06W, Gading) – a tropical storm that produced flooding in the Philippines and China together with Severe Tropical Storm Russ, causing at least 13 fatalities but reportedly killing as many as 1,400 people.
 Typhoon Vicki (1998) (T9807, 11W, Gading) – a fairly strong typhoon which had a northeastward track and struck the Philippines and Japan, killing a total of 108 people, mostly from the capsizing of the MV Princess of the Orient.

Pacific typhoon set index articles